Hinduism is the third largest religious group in the United Kingdom, after Christianity and Islam; the religion is followed by around 1.7% of the total population of the nation. Hindus had a presence in the United Kingdom since the early 19th century, as at the time India was part of the British Empire. Many Indians in the British Indian Army settled in the United Kingdom of Great Britain and Northern Ireland. According to 2011 Census of England and Wales, 817,000 residents (1.1%) identified themselves as Hindus. 

Most of the British Hindus are immigrants, mainly from India, and there are also significant number of Hindu immigrants from Sri Lanka and Nepal, with even smaller numbers from Pakistan, Afghanistan, Bangladesh, and Bhutan. In the recent times, due to the efforts of ISKCON, BAPS and other Hindu missionaries groups and mass following of Yoga, Meditation and other Hindu practises, many British citizens have embraced Hinduism, including many celebrities.

History 
The British Hindu population includes those who came directly from the Indian subcontinent, descendants of those Hindus who had originally migrated to other countries but later resettled in the United Kingdom, and those born and raised in the UK. It is not unusual to find third or fourth generation Hindus in the UK.

There have been three main waves of migration of Hindus in the UK, and most of the Hindu migration has occurred after World War II. The first wave was at the time of British India's independence and partition in 1947. Also, in the early 1960s the Conservative Health Minister the Rt Hon Enoch Powell recruited a large number of doctors from the Indian sub-continent. The second wave occurred in the 1970s mainly from East Africa especially due to the expulsion of Asians from Uganda. Later, communities included those from Guyana, Trinidad and Tobago, Mauritius and Fiji. The last wave of migration began in the 1990s and is a result of the United Kingdom's immigration policy, which made studying and immigration to the UK easier. This wave also included Tamil refugees from Sri Lanka and professionals including doctors and software engineers from India.

Demographics

Hinduism is followed by 1.5% of the population of the England. Hindus constitute 0.31% in Scotland, and 0.34% in Wales. The Hindu population in England & Wales has increased significantly due to diaspora, with better fertility rates than the average and some conversion to Hinduism.

According to the 2011 census, nearly half of the 817,000 Hindus living in the UK were residents of the London metropolitan area. About 300,000 British Hindus of all ages were born in the UK.

According to the 2021 Census, Hindus in England & Wales enumerated 1,032,775, or 1.7% of the population.

The Hindu population in the UK is predominantly urban, and has relatively higher representation in the professional and managerial positions.

Life and culture

Community and social life
In addition to this, according to survey conducted by Trust for London in 2012, Hindus living in London have the second highest median net wealth of £277,400 following British Jews' with the highest median wealth of £312,500. Hindu men are more likely than the general population to be entrepreneurs, and both Hindu men and women are more likely than the general population to have higher education. 
Over a 20-year period, British Hindus also had the third-lowest poverty level (after British Christian and British Jews), and the second-lowest rates of arrest, trial or imprisonment at 0.5% (after British Jews' 0.3%) among all ethnic groups tracked by UK's Ministry of Justice. Hindus constitute less than 0.5% of the total Prison population in Britain (compared to 48% for Christians and 15% for Muslims). According to Office for National Statistics, British Hindus also have the second highest employment rate of 76% amongst all religious groups in UK followed by people with no religious affiliation at 77%.  Employees who identified as Hindu have consistently had the second-highest median hourly earnings; in 2018, this was £13.80. 4 in 10 of those who identified as Hindu were occupied in high-skill occupations which was second in the country following British Jews. British who identified as Hindus have the highest percentage with a degree or equivalent qualification.

Temples and organisations

A University of Derby report states that there are considerable linguistic and theosophical diversities among Hindus in the United Kingdom, yet they also share certain core beliefs, rites and festivals of Hinduism.

UK-wide Hindu organisations include the National Council of Hindu Temples, the Hindu Council UK and the Hindu Forum of Britain—national umbrella organisations for Hindus in the UK. The National Council of Hindu Temples UK which is the oldest UK-wide Hindu organisation. It comprises over 300 Hindu temples (mandirs) and Hindu faith organisations. The Hindu Council UK representing almost 400 affiliated cultural and religious organisations of various Hindu denominations including temples, and the Hindu Forum of Britain, with nearly 300 member organisations.

There are regional organizations that organise community events and social affairs in the UK, such as The Hindu Council of Birmingham.

There were over 150 Hindu temples in the UK in 2012 with 30 Temples in the London area alone. Slough Hindu Temple was built by the Slough Hindu Cultural Society - formally opened in 1981 - it was the first purpose-built Hindu Temple in the British Isles. However, the first Hindu Temple in the UK was opened in the late-1920s near Earls Court in London and it was functional for about four years. In 2020, Historic England (HE) published A Survey of Hindu Buildings in England with the aim of providing information about buildings that Hindus use in England so that HE can work with communities to enhance and protect those buildings now and in the future. The scoping survey identified 187 Hindu temples in England.

There is a diversity of Hindu-based organisations in the UK including the International Society for Krishna Consciousness (ISKCON), Swaminarayan (BAPS) in Neasden (Greater London), the Chinmaya Mission, Ramakrishna Mission and Sai Organisation, each having large followings. SHYAM, an educational Hindu organisation teaches the Bhagavad Gita, Ramayana, Shrimad Bhagavad, Vedas and Upanishads.  The predominant Hindu beliefs found in the UK include its Vedanta monist, Vedanta monotheistic and various sampradayas. Less of 1% of the Hindus in the UK identify themselves to be belonging to Divine Life Society, Hare Krishna and other organizations.

Festivals and community events

Hindus in the United Kingdom celebrate major festivals such as Diwali. Homes and businesses are decorated with festive lights and Hindus gift sweets such as laddoo and barfi. Community events such as dances and parties bring Hindus and non-Hindus together. Leicester annually plays hosts to one of the biggest Diwali celebrations outside of India.

The Hindu festival of Diwali has begun to find acceptance into the larger British community. Prince Charles has attended Diwali celebrations at some of UK’s prominent Hindu temples, such as the Swaminarayan Temple in Neasden. Since 2009, Diwali has been celebrated every year at 10 Downing Street, the residence of the UK Prime Minister.

Hindu Council UK

The Hindu Council UK is an umbrella organisation for Hindus living in the United Kingdom, and is one of several groups representing Hindus that are influential at the national level. It was set up in 1994. According to the Council's then-General Secretary, it faced opposition from the Sangh Parivar when it was founded. It collaborated with the Department for Communities and Local Government to explore how caste influenced public life in the UK. A debate on religious conversion hosted on its website reflected a Hindu nationalist perspective, and included contributors from the Vishva Hindu Parishad.

Ethnicity

According to census records, 95.6% of the Hindus in England and Wales are ethnically Asian, with the 4.4% of the remainder being as follows: White 1.47%, Mixed 1.19%, Black 0.67% and other ethnicities 1% (including 0.13% Arab).

Asian 
A very large proportion of Hindus in the United Kingdom belongs to the Asian, mainly Indians who immigrated the United Kingdom for employment or took asylum due to poverty, discrimination and persecution.

Converts 
Famous converts to Hinduism include:

 The British celebrity, Russell Brand converted to Hinduism.
 Lead Guitarist of the Beatles, George Harrison converted to Hinduism in the mid 1960s. Upon his death in 2001, he was cremated per Hindu rituals and his ashes consecrated into river Ganges.
 Philosopher John Levy also converted to Hinduism.
 Novelist Christopher Isherwood, converted to Hinduism and remained a Hindu until his death.
 Hindu scholar Krishna Dharma (formerly Kenneth Anderson), converted to Hinduism in 1979.
 In September 2006, Rev. David Ananda Hart made headlines when he converted to Hinduism whilst still remaining a priest of the Church of England.

Politics

In the 2017 general election, eight Hindu MPs (five Conservative and three Labour) were elected to Parliament.

During the 2019 United Kingdom general election, The Times of India reported that supporters of Narendra Modi's ruling Bharatiya Janata Party (BJP) were actively campaigning for the Tories in 48 marginal seats, and the Today programme reported that it had seen WhatsApp messages sent to Hindus across the country urging them to vote Conservative. Some British Indians spoke out against what they saw as the BJP's meddling in the UK election. The Hindu Council UK has been strongly critical of Labour, going as far as to say that Labour is "anti-Hindu" and objected to the party's condemnation of the Indian government's actions in the disputed territory of Kashmir. Current Prime Minister, Rishi Sunak, became the first British Prime Minister who is practicing Hinduism as well as first non-white Prime Minister.

Controversies

Discrimination and stereotyping 

A report authored by Robert Berkeley of Runnymede Trust states that the Hindu community groups and organizations in the United Kingdom face systematic disadvantage and discrimination. They face a legacy of inequality, targeting and stereotyping in daily life and by the media, which has left the Hindu community isolated, with a limited capacity to engage with other communities, or address the problems they face.

Scholars state that the Hindu community in the United Kingdom, and Europe in general, has faced discrimination in immigration policies adopted by the local governments. In local councils, construction or expansion permits for Hindu temples and community centers have been turned down for years, while Muslim mosques and Christian churches have been approved by the same councils and built. The discrimination suffered by Hindu communities from the local council officials in Britain has been described by Paul Weller as follows,

Nearly 50% of Hindu children, both boys and girls, in British schools have reported to being victims of bullying for being Hindu and their religious heritage. However, Claire Monks et al. note that children of various races and religions report being victims of bullying in British schools as well.

The Hindu community in the United Kingdom is not unique in suffering discrimination and stereotyping. The similarly small Jewish community of the United Kingdom, and in recent years the much larger Muslim community of the United Kingdom, has also expressed similar concerns. New legislation and institutions to understand and respond to religious discrimination are being debated by British politicians.

Private golfing, country clubs and other social clubs in Britain have routinely discriminated against and denied entry to Hindus – in addition to Sikhs, Muslims, women, Africans and other minorities after asserting "freedom of association" principle, and parts of EU-wide law to limit this practice were adopted in the United Kingdom in 1998. In some instances of Islamist terrorism, such as after the 7 July 2005 London bombings, Hindus along with Sikhs of the United Kingdom became more targeted and vulnerable for backlash than Muslims.

In October 2018, it was reported that Conservative Party (UK) London mayoral candidate Shaun Bailey had written a pamphlet, entitled No Man’s Land, for the Centre for Policy Studies. In it, Bailey argued that accommodating Hindus "[robs] Britain of its community" and is turning the country into a "crime riddled cess pool". He also claimed that South Asians "bring their culture, their country and any problems they might have, with them" and that this was not a problem within the black community "because we’ve shared a religion and in many cases a language". In the pamphlet, Bailey had confused the Hindu religion and the Hindi language: "You don’t know what to do. You bring your children to school and they learn far more about Diwali than Christmas. I speak to the people who are from Brent and they’ve been having Hindi (sic) days off." The Conservative Party Deputy Chairman, James Cleverly, defended Bailey and insisted he was misunderstood, and that he was implying black boys were drifting into crime as a result of learning more about Hinduism rather than "their own Christian culture". However, the anti-racism Hope Not Hate campaign group called Bailey's comments "grotesque". The comments were condemned by the Hindu Council of the United Kingdom who expressed "disappointment at the misrepresentation of our faith" by Bailey.

British Overseas Territories

See also 

 Encyclopedia of Hinduism
 Hindu Council UK
 Hinduism by country
 Hinduism in England
 Hinduism in Gibraltar
 Hinduism in Northern Ireland
 Hinduism in Scotland
 Hinduism in the British Virgin Islands
 Hinduism in the Republic of Ireland
 Hinduism in the West Indies
 Hinduism in the West
 Hinduism in Wales
 List of Hindu temples in the United Kingdom
 Persecution of Hindus
 Religion in the United Kingdom
 Sanskara (rite of passage)
 Sanskrit in the West
 Vedanga
 Vivaha

References

External links

 Hinduism – Hindu Origins and Key Organisations in the UK—University of Derby
 Factsheet: Hinduism in the UK—Religion Media Centre

 
Religion in the United Kingdom
Indian diaspora in the United Kingdom